Jay Villemarette (pronounced ) is the owner, founder and president of both Skulls Unlimited International, Inc. and SKELETONS: Museum of Osteology.

Early life 
His interest in skulls began in 1972 at 7 years of age, when he found a dog skull in the woods near his house in Levittown, Pennsylvania. After encouragement by his father, he began collecting skulls. After moving to Moore, Oklahoma, Villemarette continued collecting skulls. As his interest grew, neighbors and friends began bringing him carcasses of interesting animals that they had found. During this time, he tested many methods of removing the soft tissue from the bones, including burning, acid, and boiling the bones before discovering dermestid beetles. Villemarette graduated from Moore High School before attending Moore-Norman Technology Center in Entrepreneurship. Before founding Skulls Unlimited, he worked as an auto-body mechanic.

Career

Skulls Unlimited International 
After finishing high school, Villemarette began cleaning and selling skulls as a side job. After losing his job as an auto-body mechanic, he decided to try selling skulls as a full time occupation. He began by creating a printed list of skulls for sale in 1985. In 1986, Skulls Unlimited was founded as a provider of osteological specimens. Skulls Unlimited International, Inc. is now the premier provider of  osteological specimens to nature centers, museums, medical schools, and films. All of Jay's sons still work for Skulls Unlimited International, Inc., as well as his nephew Joey Villemarette.

Skulls Unlimited International, Inc. not only sources their specimens, they still also process the carcasses using the methods Jay perfected in his adolescence. This process begins with removing the majority of the soft tissue from the carcasses by hand. Then two methods are used to detail clean the skulls: dermestid beetles and maceration. After that, skulls are whitened with hydrogen peroxide and articulated by running hardware through the bones.

Museum of Osteology 
In 2010, Villemarette opened the Museum of Osteology in South Oklahoma City, which holds over 300 skeletons on display. The 7,000 square foot space holds specimens like a 40 foot long humpback whale and the skull of a rare Javan rhinoceros.  He developed the museum primarily in hopes of it being utilized as an educational tool. The Museum of Osteology shares its space with Skulls Unlimited International, Inc.'s business office and is adjacent to the processing center.

SKELETONS: Museum of Osteology 
After success of the Oklahoma City museum, Villemarette opened a second, larger site in Orlando, Florida in May 2015, this one holding 500 skeletons. The specimens on display include an 11 foot tall African bush elephant and a Sumatran rhinoceros. Villemarette considered other locations for his second museum, including Las Vegas, before deciding on Orlando.

Television appearances 
Interest in his business has generated multiple media visits, and Villemarette has appeared in many television shows, including Dirty Jobs with Mike Rowe.

Private life 
Villemarette met his future wife, Kim Villemarette, when they were in high school. They married in 1985.  Together they have 4 children, including three sons: Jay Jr., Josh, and Jaron, and a daughter: Shala. All of Villemarette's sons are involved with the business and all of his children have participated in processing carcasses for the company from a young age.

References

Year of birth missing (living people)
Living people
Museum founders
Businesspeople from Pennsylvania
People from Levittown, Pennsylvania
20th-century American businesspeople
21st-century American businesspeople
Businesspeople from Oklahoma
People from Moore, Oklahoma